Lionel Mazars (born 26 June 1984 in Toulouse, France) is a French rugby union footballer. He mainly plays at inside and outside centre. 

His professional career started at Toulouse in the Top 16's 2004-2005 season. He only made one appearance for the club however and moved to RC Narbonne for the 2005-2006 season. With Narbonne he played 26 matches in his first season – including five appearances in the European Challenge Cup. He stayed with the club for the 2006-2007 season, and made another 28 appearances, including five more Challenge Cup appearances. 

He was selected for France in their 2007 Tour to New Zealand. He made his debut on 9 June 2007 against the All Blacks.

External links

1984 births
French rugby union players
Living people
Rugby union centres
France international rugby union players